The Campeonato de Lisboa (English: Championship of Lisbon) was a regional football league in Portugal, situated at the third level of the Portuguese football league system. The division started in 1906, even before Lisbon Football Association was created, and ran until 1947. 

In 1922 the Campeonato de Portugal was created to define who was the Portuguese Champion, it reunited all of regional league winners in a playoff. From 1934, with the establishment of the Primeira Divisão and Segunda Divisão, it became the third level. As time progressed, main clubs focused on national competitions, so the league folded in 1947.

List of champions

Full table

Note: F.C. Barreirense and Vitória de Setúbal participated until 1927 when the Setúbal Football Association was created.

References

External links
Campeonato de Lisboa at Footballzz.com
Campeonato de Lisboa 

Sport in Lisbon